The Courtlandt Gross House is a historic house located at 18600 Courtlandt Court in Tehachapi, Kern County, California.

History
Courtlandt Gross, president and board chairman of the Lockheed Corporation, owned the house.  It was completed in the Tehachapi Mountains in 1942.

The Courtlandt Gross House was added to the National Register of Historic Places on March 22, 1987.

Architecture
The house was designed by noted Los Angeles architect Donald Parkinson of Parkinson & Parkinson. The house is unusual among the Parkinsons' buildings, as they rarely designed residences, and mainly worked in the Los Angeles area.  The Courtlandt Gross House is the only Parkinson-designed home outside of the Los Angeles area.

The stone house's design includes a steep gable roof and a prominent chimney at the end of the house. The design was influenced by the Dutch Colonial Revival and Cape Cod styles. Both styles are unusual in California architecture, and the house resembles 17th- and 18th-century houses in the northeastern United States.

While stone construction is typically avoided in California due to the risk of earthquake damage, the house survived the 1952 Tehachapi earthquake with only minor damage.

See also

California Historical Landmarks in Kern County, California
National Register of Historic Places listings in Kern County, California

References

External links

Houses in Kern County, California
Tehachapi Mountains
Houses completed in 1942
Houses on the National Register of Historic Places in California
National Register of Historic Places in Kern County, California
John and Donald Parkinson buildings
Colonial Revival architecture in California
Dutch Colonial Revival architecture in the United States
1942 establishments in California